Little Genesee is a hamlet in Allegany County, New York, United States. Little Genesee has a post office with ZIP code 14754, which opened on August 6, 1845.

References

Hamlets in Allegany County, New York
Hamlets in New York (state)